The 1991 Big League World Series took place from August 10–17 in Fort Lauderdale, Florida, United States. For the third consecutive year, Taipei, Taiwan defeated Maracaibo, Venezuela in the championship game. It was Taiwan's fifth straight championship.

Teams

Results

References

Big League World Series
Big League World Series